Julie Maree Collins (born 3 July 1971) is an Australian politician. She is a member of the Australian Labor Party (ALP) and has represented the Tasmanian seat of Franklin since the 2007 federal election. She held ministerial positions in the Gillard and Rudd Governments, and is Minister for Housing and Homelessness and Minister for Small Business in the Albanese ministry.

Early life
Collins was born in Hobart on 3 July 1971. Her father died when she was five months old, leaving her mother, Anne Peters, widowed at the age of 19. She spent her early years in her grandparents' housing commission property. Her mother subsequently remarried and she was adopted by her step-father Andrew Collins.

Collins attended Cosgrove High School. She enrolled in a college to complete the final two years of her secondary education, but had to discontinue her studies for financial reasons. Shortly after the 1987 federal election she began working for the ALP as an administrative assistant. She holds a certificate IV in business administration.

In 2021, Collins was identified as one of only four federal MPs who did not graduate from high school, the others being Jacqui Lambie, Llew O'Brien and Terry Young.

Politics
Prior to entering parliament herself, Collins worked in various administrative positions for Tasmanian Labor MPs and state government departments. She worked for the state health department (1990–1993), state opposition leader Michael Field (1993–1994), Senator John Coates (1995–1996), Senator Sue Mackay (1996–1998), Hydro Tasmania (1998), state premier Jim Bacon (1998–2003), the state Department of Tourism, Parks, Heritage and the Arts (2003–2005), and Senator Carol Brown (2005–2006).

Collins was state president of Young Labor in 1996 and a delegate to state and national conference. She served as state secretary of the ALP from 2006 to 2007.

Collins is a member of Labor Left.

Parliamentary career
Before her election as Member for Franklin in 2007, Collins previously unsuccessfully stood for the seat of Denison in the 2006 state election.

She successfully held her seat in the 2010 federal election and was sworn in as Parliamentary Secretary for Community Services on 14 September 2010 in the First Gillard ministry. In 2011, Collins became Minister for Community Services, Minister for Indigenous Employment and Economic Development, and Minister for the Status of Women in the Second Gillard ministry. In 2013, Collins gained additional responsibilities as the Minister for Housing and Homelessness and was promoted to the cabinet in the Second Rudd ministry. She remained in these positions until the defeat of the Rudd Government in September 2013.

Following the 2022 federal election, Collins was appointed Minister for Housing, Minister for Homelessness and Minister for Small Business in the Albanese ministry.

Personal life
Collins has three children with her husband Ian Hubbard.

See also
 First Gillard ministry
 Second Gillard ministry
 Second Rudd ministry
 Albanese ministry

References

External links
 
 

|-

|-

|-

|-

|-

|-

|-

 

1971 births
Living people
Australian Labor Party members of the Parliament of Australia
Members of the Australian House of Representatives for Franklin
Members of the Australian House of Representatives
Women members of the Australian House of Representatives
Government ministers of Australia
Labor Left politicians
21st-century Australian politicians
21st-century Australian women politicians
Women government ministers of Australia
Albanese Government